The 3rd Cavalry Division (3-ya Kavaleriiskaya Diviziya) was a cavalry formation of the Russian Imperial Army.

Organization
1st Cavalry Brigade
3rd Dragoon Regiment
3rd Uhlan Regiment
2nd Cavalry Brigade
3rd Hussar Regiment
3rd Cossack Regiment
3rd Horse Artillery Battalion

Commanders
1908–1912: Sergei Scheidemann

References

Cavalry divisions of the Russian Empire
Military units and formations disestablished in 1918